Tambomachaya is a genus of moths belonging to the family Tortricidae.

Species
Tambomachaya pollexifera Razowski, 1989

See also
List of Tortricidae genera

References

 , 1989: Descriptions of four Neotropical taxa of Cochylini (Lepidoptera: Tortricidae). SHILAP Revista de Lepidopterologia 17 (66): 205-208 (205).
 , 2011: Diagnoses and remarks on genera of Tortricidae, 2: Cochylini (Lepidoptera: Tortricidae). Shilap Revista de Lepidopterologia 39 (156): 397–414.

External links
tortricidae.com

Cochylini
Tortricidae genera